The communauté de communes du Pays d'Issoudun is located in the Cher and Indre départements of the Centre-Val de Loire region of France. It came into force on 1 January 1994. Its area is 310.7 km2, and its population was 19,822 in 2018.

Composition
The communauté de communes consists of the following 12 communes, of which three (Chârost, Chezal-Benoît and Saint-Ambroix) in the Cher department:

Administration

Seat 
The seat of the communauté de communes is in Issoudun, on Place de Droits de l'Homme.

Elected members 
The communauté de communes is directed by a community council composed of members representing each of the member communes and elected for a term of six years. 

They are distributed as follows:

Presidency

References

Issoudun
Issoudun
Issoudun